This is a list of the last monarchs in Africa.

Notes

See also 
 Monarchies in Africa

Last Africa
Last monarchs
Monarchs in Africa